1214: No tememos a los cobardes is a 2021 Peruvian documentary film written and directed by Ernesto Carlín and Hernán Hurtado in their directorial debut. It is about the victims (1214) of the Aprista political party in the dark period of terror and death of the 80s by Shining Path.

Synopsis 
5 true stories are told about characters who were not intimidated by the threats of the terrorists and who continued to defend the message of Pan con Libertad from Haya de la Torre's party. They are dramas that took place in inland places like Ayacucho and Huancavelica or Lima districts like La Victoria, El Agustino or Surco.

Release 
It premiered on July 24, 2021, at the Aprista party venue, in Breña. Subsequently, the film was donated to the Chilean Museum of Memory and Human Rights for distribution in Chilean territory.

References

External links 
 

2021 films
2021 documentary films
Peruvian documentary films
2020s Spanish-language films
2020s Peruvian films
Films set in Peru
Films shot in Peru
Documentary films about politics
Documentary films about terrorism
2021 directorial debut films